This is a list of Members of Parliament (MPs) elected to the last parliament in the reign of King James I in 1624, which was known as the Happy Parliament.

The parliament began on 19 February 1624 and was held to 24 May 1624.  It then sat from 2 November 1624 to 16 February 1625 and was dissolved on the death of the King on 14 March 1625.

List of constituencies and members
In 1624 the constituencies of Amersham, Great Marlow, Wendover and Hertford were re-enfranchised after the Committee of Privileges investigated abuses where the right of boroughs to return burgesses had fallen into disuse.

See also
List of parliaments of England
4th Parliament of King James I

Notes

References
D. Brunton & D. H. Pennington, Members of the Long Parliament (London: George Allen & Unwin, 1954)
Cobbett's Parliamentary history of England, from the Norman Conquest in 1066 to the year 1803 (London: Thomas Hansard, 1808)

Parliaments of James I of England
1624 in England
1624 in politics
1624